The annual Malofiej Awards for Infographics were organized by the Spanish chapter of the Society for News Design (SND-E) for accomplishments in journalistic infographics. They have been regarded as some of the most prestigious in this field. The awards were given each March in Pamplona, Spain.

Submissions were invited online.

On October 1, 2021, the organizers announced that the awards would be paused “while we open a period of reflection to think about how to continue with them in the future.”

History 
The awards are named for Argentine designer Alejandro Malofiej, who made simple and creative graphics.

The Malofiej were an essential reference for their prestige and drawing power. The Awards, considered to be the Pulitzers for infographics, the professional workshop “Show, Don’t Tell!” and the Conference in Pamplona annually bring together the best infographics artists from media (newspapers, magazines, agencies) from around the world.

References

Further reading 
 El País and Errea Comunicación receive the Best of Show awards, June 17, 2021
 Behind the Awards — Explores the challenges the team faced, and how they created the visualization that won the top award of the Malofiej competition
 Inside 2019'S Malofiej World Summit, the "Pulitzer of infographics", Newspaper Club, 4 May 2019
 Online Graphics - Explore winners of the 25th Malofiej International Infographics Awards
 Laura Hazard Owen, At the Malofiej Infographics World Summit, “the best form of storytelling is often static”, Nieman Lab, 11 March 2016
Malofiej is here, dive in!, Society for News Design web site
The New York Times and National Geographic win the Endesa Best of Show Award, August 5, 2020
 Jonathon Berlin. Malofiej 20 winners: The jury talks about the gold medal work, at Society for News Design web site, March 24, 2012

 Journalism awards
 International awards
 Awards established in 1992